Chavany Shaunjay Willis (born 17 September 1997) is a Jamaican footballer who plays for Union Omaha.

Career

Club

Willis transferred from Boys Town FC to Portmore United F.C. in 2017, where he played for two seasons.  In 2019, Willis was sent on loan to USL Championship team, Bethlehem Steel FC.

In 2022, Willis transferred to USL League One club Union Omaha for an undisclosed fee.

International

Willis was called up by Jamaica in September 2019 to face Antigua and Guyana in CONCACAF Nations League. Willis made his first senior national start versus Guyana.

International goals
Scores and results list Jamaica's goal tally first.

Honors

Portmore United
Jamaica National Premier League: 2
2017–18,  2018–19

References

2000 births
Living people
Union Omaha players
USL League One players
Jamaican footballers
Association football midfielders
Jamaica international footballers
Jamaican expatriate footballers
Jamaican expatriate sportspeople in the United States
Expatriate soccer players in the United States
People from Spanish Town